is a Japanese manga series written and illustrated by Yuji Kaku. Set in the Edo period of Japan, it follows the ninja Gabimaru and the executioner Yamada Asaemon Sagiri as they search for the elixir of immortality. It was serialized weekly for free on the Shōnen Jump+ application and website from January 22, 2018, to January 25, 2021. The chapters were collected and published into 13 tankōbon volumes by Shueisha. Viz Media has licensed the series for English release in North America. An anime television series adaptation by MAPPA is set to premiere in April 2023.

Plot
Captured during an assassination mission, Gabimaru the Hollow is sentenced to be executed, but nothing seems to kill him due to his superhuman body. Believing his love for his wife to be subconsciously keeping him alive, executioner Yamada Asaemon Sagiri offers him the chance to be pardoned of all crimes by the Shogunate if he finds the elixir of life on Shinsenkyo, a legendary realm recently discovered southwest of the Ryukyu Kingdom. After losing five expedition teams sent to the island, this time the Shogunate sends a group of death row convicts. The convicts are each given a Yamada Asaemon executioner, who they must return with in order to obtain the pardon.

Characters

, Portrayed by: Tsubasa Kizu
The strongest ninja from Iwagakure, where he was trained to kill from birth. However, he is very much in love with his wife, the daughter of the village chief, who treats him differently than everyone else due to her peace-loving nature. Planning to cut ties with the village to live a normal life with his wife, he was set up by his comrades and captured.

, Portrayed by: Ayana Shiramoto
A master swordsman from the famed Yamada Asaemon family of executioners, where she is the only female executioner. She recruits Gabimaru for the expedition after seeing his talent and strong will to live. Sagiri is ranked last, 12th, in the Yamada Asaemon hierarchy.

, Portrayed by: Yūri Ōta

, Portrayed by: Yūnosuke Matsushima
A death row criminal and leader of a gang of bandits in Iyo Province.

, Portrayed by: Rui Tabuchi
The executioner assigned to Chōbei. He infiltrated the Yamada Asaemon in order to free Chōbei, who is his older brother.

, Portrayed by: Naoya Gо̄moto

, Portrayed by: Yū Miyazaki
The executioner assigned to Gantetsusai. He has a blond bob cut, a high level of medical knowledge, and is ranked ninth in the Yamada Asaemon hierarchy.

, Portrayed by: Tarо̄ Nakamura
The executioner assigned to Akaginu. He is blind and ranked fourth in the Yamada Asaemon hierarchy.

, Portrayed by: Azusa Yoshihama
A young death row criminal and member of the Sanka people. Due to her physique and behavior, she is often mistaken for a boy.

, Portrayed by: Yūta Iiyama
The executioner assigned to Nurugai. He is ranked 10th in the Yamada Asaemon hierarchy.

, Portrayed by: Satoru Mori
The executioner assigned to Yuzuriha. He is chubby, wears glasses, and is ranked fifth in the Yamada Asaemon hierarchy.

Portrayed by: Rio Sawada and Aoba Kо̄jо̄
A mysterious little girl who lives on the island.

Leader of the second team sent to acquire the elixir after the Shogunate becomes impatient with the first. He is ranked second in the Yamada Asaemon hierarchy.

Production
The storyboards for the first three chapters of Hell's Paradise: Jigokuraku were brought to the Shōnen Jump+ editorial staff in 2017. A big fan of Yuji Kaku's art since Fantasma in Jump Square, Hideaki Sakakibara enthusiastically volunteered to take on the series and became its second editor with chapters two and three. He believed that Hell's Paradise was the "mainstream battle fantasy" series that Shōnen Jump+ was still lacking and could become a best-seller in print.

Sakakibara was initially concerned with the "multi-protagonist story" of the prisoners, executioners, and the island's creatures. Although he thought having the Battle Royale-style story in a manga would be interesting, he worried it would cause a badly paced story where they would have to split up the pages between characters and be unable to show the main characters' actions as much. However, he credits Kaku's genius at quickly and simply introducing characters and his drawing talent for making it all work.

Kaku and Sakakibara planned out what was going to happen in sets of 10 chapters, or a whole volume. The editor gave Kaku free rein as far as illustrations were concerned. Sakakibara said that from the first chapter the series has had "extreme" illustrations, which has resulted in popularity among readers, but made it hard for new readers to get into. Towards the end of 2019, he and Kaku were trying to earn more female readers. With Kaku having been a former manga editor himself, Sakakibara said it is easy to communicate things to him as the artist is quick to figure out what he means. However, Kaku admitted that this has caused him to unconsciously hold back creatively by thinking objectively like an editor.

Kaku created details and backstories for every character in Hell's Paradise: Jigokuraku, regardless of whether or not they were actually included in the series. When Kaku first described the character Shion to Sakakibara, the editor imagined him like Kazuo Kiriyama from Battle Royale. But after talking it over, Shion became the kind teacher he is in the manga, while the crazy personality was given to Shugen instead.

Media

Manga
Written and illustrated by Yuji Kaku, Hell's Paradise: Jigokuraku began weekly serialization on the Shōnen Jump+ application and website on January 22, 2018. The series ended with the 127th chapter on January 25, 2021. The chapters were collected and published into 13 tankōbon volumes by Shueisha between December 4, 2020 and April 30, 2021. Shueisha also simultaneously published the series in English for free on the Manga Plus app and website. Special chapters have been published in Weekly Shōnen Jump, in issue No. 27/28 on August 6, 2018 and issue No. 28 on June 10, 2019.

, a comedic spin-off manga created by Ōhashi, began serialization on Shōnen Jump+ on January 20, 2020. It ended with the 21st chapter on June 29, 2020. The chapters were collected and published into one tankōbon on September 4, 2020.

Viz Media began publishing Hell's Paradise: Jigokuraku in English digitally on their website for free on May 17, 2018. They released the first volume in print on March 17, 2020.

Volume list

Anime
An anime television series adaptation was announced by Weekly Shōnen Jump in January 2021. It is produced by MAPPA and directed by Kaori Makita, with Akira Kindaichi writing the scripts, Koji Hisaki designing the characters, and Yoshiaki Dewa composing the music. The series is set to premiere on April 1, 2023, on TV Tokyo and other networks. Crunchyroll has licensed the series for streaming in America, Europe, Africa, Oceania, the Middle East, and CIS, while Netflix has licensed the series in Asia Pacific (excluding Mainland China, Australia, New Zealand).

Other media
A novel adaptation, was written by Sakaku Hishikawa and published on September 4, 2019. Shueisha published  on April 30, 2021. The "fan book" includes character profiles, concept art, new manga stories, and an interview with Tatsuki Fujimoto.

An exhibition of Kaku's manuscripts and illustrations from the series was held at Tokyo Manga Salon Trigger from November 3–9, 2018. Another exhibition was held at Tower Records in Shibuya from August 29 to September 22, 2020, where collaborative goods designed just for the event were sold.

Gabimaru is a playable character in the July 2022 Nintendo Switch video game Captain Velvet Meteor: The Jump+ Dimensions.

A stage play adaptation of Hell's Paradise: Jigokuraku ran at Hulic Hall in Tokyo from February 16–26, 2023.

Reception
In August 2018, Hell's Paradise: Jigokuraku was cited as the most popular series on Shōnen Jump+. Over 1 million copies of the series were in circulation by June 2019, a number that grew to 2.5 million by August 2020, and more than 3.6 million by April 2021. By December 2022, the manga had sold over 4 million copies. Volume two of the series sold 16,328 copies during its first week of release. Volume four sold 20,139 its first week, while volume five sold 45,912 copies. The 13th and final volume of the series sold 39,759 copies in its first week.

With 16,510 votes, Hell's Paradise: Jigokuraku came in 11th place in the Web Manga Category of the 2018 Next Manga Awards, organized by Niconico and Da Vinci magazine. The series came in fourth on Honya Club's Nationwide Bookstore Employees' Recommended Comics of 2018 list, compiled by surveying 1,100 professional bookstore employees in Japan. In the 2019 edition of Kono Manga ga Sugoi!, which surveys people in the manga and publishing industry, Hell's Paradise: Jigokuraku was one of three series tied for 16th place on its list of the best manga series for male readers.

Publishers Weekly wrote that the mysterious first volume and Kaku's detailed illustrations, which they found to be reminiscent of Junji Ito's horror manga and give the series an unsettling, gruesome charm, start the series off with promise. Reviewing the first chapter for The Fandom Post, Chris Beveridge gave it a B grade for its artwork, interesting ideas and covering a lot of ground in its setup so it can move forward. The end reveal reminded him of the novel Annihilation. However, he felt the structure was a little awkward and expressed concern that it would fall into the "usual manga storytelling traps." In a review of the second collected volume, Beveridge's colleague Richard Gutierrez said that while the nightmarishly beautiful images and action might be what initially draws in readers, its the "underlying complex character construction within this sadistic story which forces us to stay."

Leroy Douresseaux called Hell's Paradise: Jigokuraku volume 1 one of the best first volumes of a manga tankōbon/graphic novel that he has ever read in a 9/10 review for Comic Book Bin. He stated that Kaku enthralls readers with the mysteries of the island while his illustrations are "like taking some of the most shocking art from the legendary EC Comics' horror titles and multiplying it by the power of 10." Kiara Halls of Comic Book Resources called the first volume a "great, emotional bloodbath" that provides "bloody, classic shonen action with uncommonly sincere emotional depth." She explained that while establishing the relationship between Sagiri and Gabimaru forms the crux of the volume, it's an uncommon one as their bond is "of mutual respect formed by an emotional connection," not of dominance or lust. That coupled with "solid, detailed art and supernatural intrigue," had Halls call the series a potential breakout hit.

Reviewing the first volume for Anime News Network, Rebecca Silverman and Faye Hopper both gave it 3.5 stars out of 5. Both critics praised the main characters Sagiri and Gabimaru and their relationship, with Hopper stating the way their struggles mirror and allow each other to empathize and grow despite their opposed roles is executed with "thoughtfulness and real power, and imbues a gritty, gory seinen with heart." Silverman felt that despite containing some elements derivative of other works, Hell's Paradise: Jigokuraku manages to make them into "a story worth paying attention to" and is entertaining. Hopper wrote that while the violent manga is not for everyone, it has terrific, macabre art, a solid hook, and rich characters, and she admires it for showing how "casual, uncritical brutality hurts the soul, and that revulsion to it is normal and should be accepted."

Notes

References

External links
 Official website
 Official play website
 Official page at Shōnen Jump+
 Official Viz Media page
 

2018 webcomic debuts
2023 anime television series debuts
Action anime and manga
Crunchyroll anime
Dark fantasy anime and manga
Edo period in literature
Japanese webcomics
MAPPA
Ninja in anime and manga
Psychological thriller anime and manga
Shōnen manga
Shueisha manga
Upcoming anime television series
Viz Media manga
Webcomics in print